is the 21st single of Japanese singer Shoko Sawada released on February 5, 1994, under the King Records label. It was used as a first ending song for the TV Tokyo anime series Akazukin Chacha.

Track list

References 

1994 singles
1994 songs
Anime songs
King Records (Japan) singles